Saint Marcian (Marciano, Marziano, Marcianus) of Tortona (died 117 or 120 AD) is a saint of Roman Catholic church. He is traditionally said to have been the first bishop of Tortona, in what is now north-western Italy, a post he held for forty-five years.

Legend
Tradition states that he was born to a pagan family but was converted by Saint Barnabas and then confirmed in the Christian faith by Saint Sirus (Siro), bishop of Pavia.  Saint Secundus of Asti is said to have met Marcian at Tortona, when the former was still a pagan.  Secundus' meeting with Marcian influenced his decision to become a Christian.  He is said to have been crucified for his Christianity.

There is some disagreement about the year of his death. Some sources say it occurred in 117, under Trajan, while others say it was under Hadrian in 120.

Historicity
Some people have argued that he is the same person as Marcian of Ravenna.  Documents from the eighth century attest to his episcopate.  Walafrid Strabo, in response to the construction of a church in honor of the saint, indicates that Marcian was the first bishop of the Tortonese community and a martyr.  His relics, found on the left bank of the Scrivia in the fourth century by Saint Innocent (Innocenzo), bishop of Brescia, can now be found in the cathedral of Tortona.  A finger bone associated with the saint has been kept at Genola, of which he is also patron.

Veneration
He is the patron saint of Tortona.  His feast day is March 6.

References
Catholic-Forum.com entry on Marcian
Saints of March 6: Marcian of Tortona
 San Marciano (Marziano) di Tortona

120 deaths
People from Tortona
Italian saints
Bishops of Tortona
2nd-century Italian bishops
People from the Province of Alessandria
2nd-century Christian saints
Year of birth unknown